502 Blues is a jazz standard composed in 1958 by Jimmy Rowles. The composition is best known through Wayne Shorter's rendition in his 1967 album, Adam's Apple.

Musical composition 
The song is a 32-bar waltz in A minor.

Notable recordings 

 Bill Holman - Mel Lewis Quintet in "Jive for Five (1959)"
 Wayne Shorter in "Adam's Apple (1967)"
 Harold Danko Trio in "Three of Four (1998)"
 Michael Cochrane, Bob Malach, Calvin Hill, and Jeff Hirshfield in "Quartet Music (2001)"
 Jeremy Pelt in "Close to My Heart (2003)"

References 

Jazz standards
1950s jazz standards
Jazz compositions
Jazz compositions in A minor